The Swimming competition at the 2001 Mediterranean Games occurred September 3–7 in Tunis, Tunisia.

Participating countries
19 countries had swimmers at the 2001 Mediterranean Games were:

Event schedule

Results

Men

Women

Medal tables

References

Mediterranean Games
Sports at the 2001 Mediterranean Games
2001